Luke  can be a surname.

The name Luke is the English form of the Latin name . It is derived from the Latin name Lucius, and it either means "the great Lucius", or it is a shortened form of the Latin name. Lucius means "the bright one" or "the one born at dawn".

Surname

Alan Luke (born 1959), British speed skater
Alexandra Luke (1901–1967), Canadian artist
Alfred James Luke (1871–1920), Australian politician
Arthur Luke (1923–1996), Australian rules footballer
Austin Luke (born 1994), American basketball player
Benny Luke (1939–2013), French-American actor
Billy Luke (1890–1992), English footballer
Charles Luke (disambiguation), multiple people
Charlie Luke (disambiguation), multiple people
Cole Luke (born 1995), American football player
David Luke (1921–2005), German scholar
Dennick Luke (born 2001), Dominican runner
Derek Luke (born 1974), American actor
Derek Luke (soccer) (born 1993), American soccer player
Desiree Luke, Trinidadian cricketer
Desmond Luke (born 1935), Sierra Leonian politician
Doug Luke (1929–2015), English photographer
Émile F. Luke (1895–1980), Sierra Leonian scouting official
Eric Luke, American writer
Frank Luke (1897–1918), American fighter pilot
Fred Luke (born 1946), American athlete
Frederick Luke (1895–1983), English army officer
Gabriel Luke (born 1969), American sprinter
Gaddam Samuel Luke (1920–2000), Indian bishop
Gail Luke (born 1963), Australian hurdler
George Luke (1933–2010), English footballer
George Luke (footballer, born 1948) (born 1948), English footballer
Harry Luke (1884–1969), British colonial official
Horace Luke (born 1970), Taiwanese entrepreneur
Iain Luke (born 1951), Scottish politician
Issac Luke (born 1987), New Zealand rugby league footballer
Jan Lüke (born 1989), German rower
Jemima Luke (1813–1906), English writer
Jeremy Luke (born 1977), American actor
John Luke (disambiguation), multiple people
Jordan Luke (born 1993/1994), Australian rugby union footballer
Josef Lüke (1899–1948), German footballer
Kenneth Luke (1896–1971), Australian manufacturer
Keye Luke (1904–1991), Chinese-American actor
Laidback Luke (born 1976), Dutch-Filipino disc jockey
Lauren Luke (born 1981), English makeup artist
Matt Luke (disambiguation), multiple people
Matthew Luke (??–1722), Italian pirate
Ming Luke, American conductor
Monte Luke (1885–1962), Australian photographer
Ned Luke (born 1958), American actor
Noel Luke (born 1964), English footballer
Oliver Luke (1574–1651), English politician
Onofiok Luke (born 1978), Nigerian politician
Pearl Luke (born 1958), Canadian novelist
Peter Luke (1919–1995), British writer
Richard Luke (1948–2014), Australian rules footballer
Robin Luke (born 1942), American singer
Samuel Luke (1603–1670), English politician
Soni Luke (born 1996), Australian rugby league footballer
Steve Luke (born 1953), American football player
Tamara Luke (born 1988), Australian rules footballer
Theresa Luke (born 1967), Canadian rower
Thomas Luke (1891–1935), British pilot
Timothy Luke (born 1951), American professor
Tony Luke (born 1985), Indian actor
Tony Luke Jr. (born 1962), American restaurateur
Wing Luke (1925–1965), Chinese-American politician
Yudell Luke (1918–1983), American mathematician

References

Surnames from given names
Patronymic surnames